Yizhu Township or Yijhu Townshop is a rural township in Chiayi County, Taiwan.

Geography

Administrative divisions
The township comprises the villages of Anjiao, Beihua, Beiqian, Guanhe, Guanshun, Houzeng, Liugui, Longjiao, Pingxi, Renli, Touzhu, Tungguang, Tungguo, Tungrong, Wucuo, Xiguo, Xindian, Xinfu, Xizhou, Yizhu, Zhongping and Zhuanfang.

Tourist attractions
 Donghouliao Church
 Donghouliao Jhao Family Historic House
 Wong Cingjiang Historic House
 Yijhu Park

Notable natives
 Weng Chang-liang, Magistrate of Chiayi County
 Wong Chung-chun, member of Legislative Yuan (2008–2016)

References

External links

 Yizhu Government website

Townships in Chiayi County